"Slayer, Interrupted" is a comic book storyline based on the Buffy the Vampire Slayer television series that was published in Buffy the Vampire Slayer #57–59 by Dark Horse Comics. It was later reprinted as part of a trade paperback collected edition. It was influenced by events detailed in the episode "Normal Again". The title references the best-selling memoir Girl, Interrupted, also about institutionalization.

Story description

General synopsis

After running off to Vegas, Buffy has written in her diary tales of vampires and demons.  Her parents have her put into a mental institution. Whilst there Buffy realises she enjoys the freedom, and the loss of her role as Slayer. However certain doctors are not what they appear. In England, Rupert Giles's use of magic has prevented a Watcher from causing destruction to the Council.

Buffy the Vampire Slayer #56

Comic title: "Slayer, Interrupted, act 1"

Buffy returns from Las Vegas where she had been on a trip with Pike. Dawn has been reading her diary, and tells their parents. Since Buffy had also recently burned down her school gym and run off to Las Vegas, they fear that she has lost her mind. Feeling like they have little choice, Buffy's parents have her committed.

Buffy the Vampire Slayer #57

Comic title: "Slayer, Interrupted, act 2"

Buffy is staying at an institution and sort of likes not having to slay vampires and other forces of evil night after night. However, something sinister is going on as the doctors may not have just the patients' interests at heart. Meanwhile, Giles has to face consequences for using black magic even if it was done to protect the Watchers' Council.

Buffy the Vampire Slayer #58

Comic title: "Slayer, Interrupted, act 3"

Buffy had assumed the girls who claimed they were brides to the demon Rakagore were crazy, but when Rakagore shows up, Buffy is forced to reconsider. A medicated Buffy does her best to deal with the demon who had preyed upon young hospitalized women but may need help.

Buffy the Vampire Slayer #59

Comic title: "Slayer, Interrupted, act 4"

Buffy does not know whom she can trust but she tries to save the group of young girls from the demon that feeds off them. Eventually she leaves the hospital, and her parents prepare for some big life changes.

Connections
The Buffy television episode Normal Again raises the possibility that Buffy never actually left the asylum and that her life in Sunnydale may have been a delusion lasting 7 years. In 2011 during the final episodes of the long running soap opera "All My Children" former star Sarah Michelle Gellar returned for a guest cameo as an unnamed character. She played a well dressed, coiffured and otherwise coherent young woman brought in for medication after claiming to see vampires.

References

Psychiatric hospitals in fiction